Canyon City is a 1943 American Western film directed by Spencer Gordon Bennet and starring Don 'Red' Barry, Wally Vernon and Helen Talbot.

Cast
 Don 'Red' Barry as Terry Reynolds - posing as the Nevada Kid 
 Wally Vernon as Beauty Bradshaw 
 Helen Talbot as Edith Gleason 
 Twinkle Watts as Twinkle Hardy 
 Morgan Conway as Craig Morgan 
 Emmett Vogan as Emerson Wheeler 
 Stanley Andrews as Johnson - Water Co. President
 Roy Barcroft as Jeff Parker 
 LeRoy Mason as Webb Hepburn 
 Pierce Lyden as Mac - Henchman 
 Forbes Murray as Judge Gleason 
 Edward Peil Sr. as Jim Hardy
 Eddie Gribbon as Deputy Frank

References

Bibliography
  Len D. Martin. The Republic Pictures Checklist: Features, Serials, Cartoons, Short Subjects and Training Films of Republic Pictures Corporation, 1935-1959. McFarland, 1998.

External links
 

1943 films
1943 Western (genre) films
1940s English-language films
American Western (genre) films
Films directed by Spencer Gordon Bennet
Republic Pictures films
American black-and-white films
1940s American films